The Incredibles is a Disney media franchise created by Pixar Animation Studios. Brad Bird wrote and directed both films, and Craig T. Nelson, Holly Hunter, Sarah Vowell, and Samuel L. Jackson are part of the cast. The first film, The Incredibles, was released in November 2004 and received acclaim from critics, winning the Academy Award for Best Animated Feature. The second film, Incredibles 2, was released in June 2018, received mostly positive reviews and set the record for best opening weekend for an animated film with $183 million. The series has grossed a combined $1.8 billion worldwide.

The franchise takes place in a fictional universe where superheroes, also known as "Supers", co-exist with society and are occasionally forced into action despite a ban issued on them by the government. The setting of said universe is a futuristic version of the 1960s.

Films

The Incredibles (2004)
The Incredibles is Pixar's sixth film. The story revolves around Bob and Helen Parr, a couple of superheroes, known as Mr. Incredible and Elastigirl, that attempt to live a quiet suburban life with their three children as a result of a government mandate that forces them to hide their powers and become ordinary citizens. However, Bob's desire of helping people draws the entire family into a confrontation with a vengeful fan-turned-foe.

Incredibles 2 (2018)

Incredibles 2 is Pixar's twentieth film. The film follows Helen as she is chosen by a telecommunications corporation to pull off a publicity stunt with the goal of regaining the public's trust in superheroes while Bob is left to care for their kids, Violet, Dash and Jack-Jack. However, the family is called into action once again when Helen clashes against a new foe who seeks to turn the populace against all superheroes.

Future films
Following the release of Incredibles 2, director Brad Bird acknowledged that the film's truncated production schedule resulted in many plotlines and ideas he had for the film being cut from the final version. He cited Pixar's decision in October 2016 to swap the release dates of Toy Story 4 and Incredibles 2, which meant that Bird's film lost a full year of production. Bird stated that the lingering plotlines could lead to a third installment, just as they did with the second: "There were a lot of ideas that we had on this film that could be [used]... whether it's another Incredibles film, or something else". Cast members including Samuel L. Jackson and Sophia Bush have expressed interest in reprising their roles. Producer John Walker said of a potential third film: "I wouldn't ever rule it out. And if past is prologue, it'll be another 14 years — and a lot of people would need oxygen to make a third one".

Short films

Jack-Jack Attack (2005)

A short film was released on March 15, 2005 on the first film's DVD release, entitled Jack-Jack Attack. Bird returned to write and direct the short. It was originally conceived to be part of the first film, but decided to make it into a short. The short takes place during the events of the first film and follows Kari as she babysits Jack-Jack while discovering his newly awakened superpowers in the process.

Mr. Incredible and Pals (2005)

Another short film titled Mr. Incredible and Pals was also included on the first film's DVD release. The short is presented as an episode of a 1960s animated series animated in the style of Syncro-Vox (an animation technique famously used Clutch Cargo). Craig T. Nelson and Samuel L. Jackson appear in character as Mr. Incredible and Frozone respectively in the short's commentary track.

Auntie Edna (2018)
A short film entitled Auntie Edna was released in Autumn 2018 with the film's digital, DVD and Blu-ray release of Incredibles 2. In a similar manner to Jack-Jack Attack, the short follows Edna during the events of Incredibles 2 as she babysits Jack-Jack while coping with his newly discovered powers.

Pixar Popcorn (2021)
Two short films entitled Chore Day – The Incredibles Way and Cookie Num Num, alongside eight other Pixar shorts, were released on Disney+ as part of the Pixar Popcorn series on January 22, 2021. Chore Day – The Incredibles Way follows the Parr family as they utilize their unique powers for daily chores. Cookie Num Num follows the Parr family as they race to eat the last cookie during midnight snack time.

Video games

The Incredibles (2004)

A video game developed by Heavy Iron Studios and published by THQ based on the 2004 film was released on October 31, 2004 for PlayStation 2, Mobile phone, Microsoft Windows, Mac OS X, Game Boy Advance, GameCube, and Xbox.

The Incredibles: When Danger Calls (2004)
A PC game developed by ImaginEngine and published by THQ based on the 2004 film was released on November 3, 2004. It is a collection of 10 minigames, which are variations of common arcade games, including side-scrolling avoidance games, catch-something-falling exercises, and games that require players to hit buttons at  the appropriate moment.

The Incredibles: Rise of the Underminer (2005)
 
A video game presented as a direct continuation of The Incredibles (until Incredibles 2 rendered it non-canon), released in October 24, 2005 for PlayStation 2, Microsoft Windows, Mac OS X, Game Boy Advance, GameCube, and Xbox, once again developed by Heavy Iron Studios and published by THQ. The game takes place after the events of the film and follows Mr. Incredible and Frozone as they face off against the Underminer as he prepares his attack on the Earth's surface.

Lego The Incredibles (2018)

A Lego video game adaptation based on the events of the first two films was developed by TT Fusion and released by Warner Bros. Interactive Entertainment on June 15, 2018 for Nintendo Switch, Xbox One and PlayStation 4 coinciding with the release of Incredibles 2.

Other miscellaneous titles
The Incredibles have made appearances in other Disney-related video games. The core cast of characters appear in all three Disney Infinity games in which characters from the films appear as playable characters, with the first game featuring a play set based on the franchise, along with the members of the Parr family (except Jack-Jack) and Syndrome as playable characters. Kinect Rush: A Disney–Pixar Adventure for Xbox 360, Xbox One, and Windows 10, includes missions from various Pixar films including The Incredibles. The five members of the Parr family, Frozone and Syndrome appear as playable characters in Disney Magic Kingdoms, along with some attractions based on locations of the film. Additionally, the whole Parr family, Frozone, Syndrome, The Underminer, and Voyd are all playable heroes in Disney Heroes: Battle Mode.

Cast and characters

Note: A dark grey cell indicates that the character did not appear in that medium.

Production

Production for the first film
The Incredibles as a concept dates back to 1993 when Bird sketched the family during a period in which he tried to break into film. Personal issues had percolated into the story as they weighed on him in life. During this time, Bird had inked a production deal with Warner Bros. Animation and was in the process of directing his first feature, The Iron Giant. Approaching middle age and having high aspirations for his filmmaking, Bird pondered whether his career goals were attainable only at the price of his family life. He stated, "Consciously, this was just a funny movie about superheroes. But I think that what was going on in my life definitely filtered into the movie." After the box office failure of The Iron Giant, Bird gravitated toward his superhero story.

He imagined it as a homage to the 1960s comic books and spy films from his boyhood and he initially tried to develop it as a 2D cel animation. When The Iron Giant became a box office bomb, he reconnected with old friend John Lasseter at Pixar in March 2000 and pitched his story idea to him. Bird and Lasseter knew each other from their college years at CalArts in the 1970s. Lasseter was sold on the idea and convinced Bird to come to Pixar, where the film would be done in computer animation. The studio announced a multi-film contract with Bird on May 4, 2000, breaking Pixar's mold of having directors who had all risen through the ranks. The Incredibles was written and directed solely by Brad Bird, a departure from previous Pixar productions which typically had two or three directors and as many screenwriters. In addition, it would be the company's first film in which all characters are human.

Production for the second film
Following the first film, Brad Bird directed his next film for Pixar, Ratatouille, which was released in June 2007. Near its premiere, Bird said he was open to an idea of a sequel to The Incredibles, but only if it could be even better than the original. He stated, "I have pieces that I think are good, but I don't have them all together."

In a May 2013 interview, Bird reiterated his interest in a sequel: "I have been thinking about it. People think that I have not been, but I have—because I love those characters, and love that world." He added: "I am stroking my chin and scratching my head. I have many, many elements that I think would work really well in another Incredibles film, and if I can get 'em to click all together, I would probably wanna do that." While publicizing the first film, Bird had already conceptualized the eventual approach where Bob and Helen would switch roles, and Jack-Jack would develop multiple powers yet known by the family.

Pixar announced in November 2016 that both Holly Hunter and Samuel L. Jackson would return to reprise their roles, and at the July 2017 D23 Expo that both Craig T. Nelson and Sarah Vowell would also return with them. Spencer Fox, the original voice of Dashiell "Dash" Parr, was replaced in the sequel by younger newcomer Huck Milner. Also that July, Brad Bird and John Ratzenberger were confirmed as reprising their characters from the first film.

In November 2017, Pixar announced that Bob Odenkirk and Catherine Keener had been signed to the cast, but did not disclose their roles as new characters Winston and Evelyn Deavor until a later date. In January 2018, it was announced that Sophia Bush and Isabella Rossellini would voice new characters Voyd and The Ambassador, while Jonathan Banks would voice Rick Dicker, after the character's original voice actor, Bud Luckey, retired in 2014; after his death in 2018, the film was dedicated to Luckey's memory.

Health concerns
Many disability advocates, including the Epilepsy Foundation, have raised concerns that scenes in Incredibles 2 with flashing lights, particularly the scene of Elastigirl's fight with the Screenslaver, can trigger seizures in viewers affected by photosensitive epilepsy. Because of this, several theaters posted warnings for audiences with this condition. Disney issued a statement to USA Today stating that they appreciated the efforts the theaters had already made in making signs warning people seeing the movie. They then advised theaters to warn audiences about the scene in a sign that read, "Incredibles 2 contains a sequence of flashing lights, which may affect customers who are susceptible to photosensitive epilepsy or other photosensitivities".

Crew

Reception

Box office performance

Critical and public response

Academy Awards

Notes

References

The Incredibles
Film franchises introduced in 2004
Comedy film franchises
Animated film series
Pixar franchises
Children's film series
2000s English-language films
2010s English-language films